Ezio Leonardi (born 25 July 1929) is an Italian politician who served as Mayor of Novara from 1971 to 1978 and as Senator for two legislatures (1987–1992, 1992–1994).

References

1929 births
Living people
Mayors of Novara
Senators of Legislature X of Italy
Senators of Legislature XI of Italy
20th-century Italian politicians
Christian Democracy (Italy) politicians